Inge Solar (21 December 1926 – 27 November 2017) was an Austrian figure skater. She competed in the ladies' singles event at the 1948 Winter Olympics.

References

External links
 

1926 births
2017 deaths
Austrian female single skaters
Olympic figure skaters of Austria
Figure skaters at the 1948 Winter Olympics
Place of birth missing